East Harling Common is a  biological Site of Special Scientific Interest east of Thetford in Norfolk.

The importance of this site lies in its pingos, periglacial ground ice depressions, and it has many scarce species of beetles. There are also areas of chalk grassland and floristically rich fen.

References

Sites of Special Scientific Interest in Norfolk